Vanan may refer to:
 Vanan, Ardabil (ونان - Vanān)
 Vanan, Chaharmahal and Bakhtiari  (وانان - Vānān)
 Vanan, Qom (ونان - Vanān)